"Block Party" is a song performed by Stacy Lattisaw and Johnny Gill from their duet album Perfect Combination. The song was written by Narada Michael Walden, who also wrote her uptempo 1980 single "Jump to the Beat". It entered three Billboard charts in total.

Track listing

1984 release
12-inch vinyl
 US: Cottilion / 7 99725

7-inch vinyl
 US: Cottilion / 7 99725

Chart position

References

1984 songs
1984 singles
Songs written by Narada Michael Walden
Songs written by Preston Glass
Stacy Lattisaw songs
Johnny Gill songs
Male–female vocal duets